Paris Descartes University, also known as Paris V, was a French public university located in Paris. It was one of the inheritors of the historic University of Paris, which was split into 13 universities in 1970. Paris Descartes completely merged with Paris Diderot University in 2019 to form a new Paris Cité University.

It was established as a multidisciplinary university "of humanities and health sciences" ("des Sciences de l’Homme et de la Santé". It focused on the areas of medical sciences, biomedical sciences, law, computer science, social sciences, economics and psychology.

Its main campus was in the historic École de Chirurgie in the 6th arrondissement of Paris.

History

The historic University of Paris first appeared in the second half of the 12th century, but was divided into thirteen universities, managed by a common rectorate, the Chancellerie des Universités de Paris, after the student protests of the French May.

Administration

Campus

Descartes University has ten campuses in Paris. Its headquarters are centered on the "Collège de chirurgie", which was built in place of the "Collège de Bourgogne", in the Quartier Latin, on the rue des Écoles. The teaching facilities and the research laboratories are housed in the Saints-Pères university center, as far as the medical school and the social sciences school are concerned. The refurbished Henri-Piéron center contains the school of psychology, whereas the Law school is located in Malakoff. The dentistry school is located in Montrouge.

Admission

The undergraduate program of Paris Descartes is selective, with an acceptance rate of 11%.
Admission to the second year of the university's master programs is selective as well, some of these programs admitting only 1.7% of applicants which can represent 25 students by programs.

International conventions

The University Paris V has signed over 150 conventions with foreign universities across five continents, including Manchester, Warwick, Copenhagen, Rome, Madrid, Rotterdam, Helsinki, Stockholm or Ghent.

Research

Areas

The university focuses on medical sciences (medicine, dental medicine, pharmacy, psychology), biomedical sciences (cellular and molecular biology, biochemistry, chemistry, biomedical physics), social sciences (sociology, anthropology, linguistics, demographics, science of education), mathematics, computer science and law (information technology law, business law, tax law, public law, private law...).

The University Paris Descartes supports a modern approach of social sciences on the basis of fieldwork, participant observation and ethnography (Master's degree in cultural and social anthropology, at the School of humanities and social sciences - Sorbonne). The dual master's degree ("Economics and Psychology" and "Cogmaster") in partnership with other important French academic institutions such as Pantheon-Sorbonne University and the École Normale Supérieure emphasizes opportunities offered as far as research is concerned.

Rankings

Paris Descartes was rated by the 2017 QS World University Ranking by Subject:
51–100th in Pharmacy and Pharmacology (1st ex aequo in France), 
151–200 in Biological Sciences (4th ex aequo in France), 
121 in Medicine (2nd in France), 
251–300th in Psychology (2nd in France), 
251–300th in Linguistics (3rd ex aequo in France) 

It was also rated by the 2016/17 The Times Higher Education Subject Rankings as:
201–250 (4th ex aequo in France) in Medicine,
201–250 (1st in France) in Psychology.

In Law, in 2016/17, it was not ranked among the top 10 of France of Eduniversal rankings.

Notable people

Faculty members 

 Georges Balandier
 Jean-Michel Berthelot
 Erwan Dianteill
 Erol Gelenbe
 Axel Kahn 
 Michel Kazatchkine
 Michel Maffesoli
 Hervé Morin
 Georges Vigarello

Alumni 

 Olivier Brandicourt, physician and former CEO of Sanofi
Jacqueline Dutheil de la Rochère, former president of Panthéon-Assas University
 Jon Elster, social and political theorist
 François Fillon, former French Prime Minister
 Béatrice Galinon-Mélénec, founder of the e. laboratory on Human Trace Complex System Unesco
 Nadey Hakim, surgeon and Vice President of the Royal Society of Medicine
Keuky Lim, former Minister for Foreign Affairs of the Khmer Republic
Ramata Ly-Bakayoko, Ivorian Minister of Women, Families, and Children
Sophie Postel-Vinay, French physician and oncology researcher
 Élizabeth Teissier, astrologist

Points of interest 
 Jardin Botanique, Université Paris V
 Musée d'Anatomie Delmas-Orfila-Rouvière

Gallery

See also
 René Descartes

References

External links
 
University web site 
Faculté des Sciences Humaines et Sociales - Sorbonne 
Institut de Psychologie 

 
Buildings and structures in the 6th arrondissement of Paris
Medical schools in France
1970 establishments in France
2019 disestablishments in France